Iman Mohamed Abdulmajid (Somali: Iimaan Maxamed Cabdulmajiid, born Zara Mohamed Abdulmajid, 25 July 1955), known mononymously as Iman, is a Somali–American supermodel, actress, and entrepreneur. A muse of the designers Gianni Versace, Thierry Mugler, Calvin Klein, Donna Karan, and Yves Saint Laurent, she is also noted for her philanthropic work. She was married to the rock musician David Bowie from 1992 until his death in 2016.

Early life
Iman was born Zara Mohamed Abdulmajid (Somali: Zara Maxamed Cabdulmajiid) in Mogadishu, Somalia and raised as a Muslim. She was later renamed Iman, meaning "faith" in Arabic at her grandfather's urging, who believed she would "prosper" with a masculine name. Iman is the daughter of Mariam and Mohamed Abdulmajid. Her father, a diplomat, was the Somali ambassador to Saudi Arabia, and her mother was a gynecologist. She has four siblings: two brothers and two sisters, and was the first girl in her family in six generations of sons.

Iman lived with her grandparents during her formative years. At age four she was sent to boarding school in Egypt, where she spent most of her childhood and adolescence. Following political unrest in Somalia, Iman's father moved the family back to the country. At his behest, she and her mother and siblings subsequently traveled to Kenya and were later joined by her father and younger sister. She briefly studied political science at the University of Nairobi in 1975.

Career

Modeling
While she was at university, Iman was discovered by the American photographer Peter Beard, and moved to the United States to begin a modeling career. Her first modeling assignment was for Vogue a year later in 1976. She soon appeared on the cover of some of the world’s most prestigious magazines, establishing herself as a supermodel.

With her long neck, slender figure, fine features, and copper-toned skin, Iman was an instant success in the fashion world, though she herself insists that her looks are merely typically Somali. She became a muse to many prominent designers, including Halston, Gianni Versace, Calvin Klein, Issey Miyake and Donna Karan. She was a favourite of Yves Saint-Laurent, who once described her as his "dream woman". Iman has worked with photographers including Helmut Newton, Richard Avedon, Irving Penn, and Annie Leibovitz.

Iman credits the nurturing she received from various designers with having given her the confidence to succeed in an era when individuality was valued and model-muses were often an integral part of the creative process. She is represented by TESS Management in London.

Business

Iman Cosmetics
After almost two decades of modeling, Iman started her own cosmetics firm in 1994, focusing on difficult-to-find shades for women. Based on her years of experience mixing her own formulations for make-up artists to use on her, she was closely involved with the final product and also acted as the commercial face of the company. Iman Cosmetics was a $25-million-a-year business by 2010. It is centered on $14.99 foundations in four formulations and 14 shades, and is among the top-selling foundation brands on Walgreens website.

In early 2012, Iman signed fellow Somali designers Ayaan and Idyl Mohallim, founders of the Mataano fashion company, as brand ambassadors for her cosmetics line. In late 2021, Iman released her signature fragrance, "Love Memoir." The color of the amber bottle is a nod to the sunsets she and her husband enjoyed. The shape of the bottle is a mimic of two stones, which references to a spiritual ritual where you place flat stones to guide people who come after you. The tradition is also connected to healing from grief. Iman has done this ritual around her and David’s property.

Global Chic
Due to her marketability and high profile, Iman was approached in 2007 by the CEO of the Home Shopping Network (HSN) to create a clothing design line. Inspired by her childhood in Egypt and modeling time with Halston, Iman's first collection introduced embroidered, one-size-fits-all caftans. Her collection on HSN is called Global Chic.

Television

Iman appeared in two episodes of Miami Vice, playing Dakotah in Back in the World (1985) and Lois Blyth in Love at First Sight (1988). She also had a guest role as Mrs. Montgomery on The Cosby Show (1985). In 1988, she appeared as Marie Babineaux in an episode of In the Heat of the Night.

In the mid-2000s, Iman spent two years as the host of Bravo TV's fashion-themed show, Project Runway Canada. In November 2010, along with her friend and colleague, designer Isaac Mizrahi, Iman also began hosting the second season of The Fashion Show. Bravo started the series to replace its former hit Project Runway that has now moved to the Lifetime network.

Film
Iman first featured in the 1979 British film The Human Factor, and had a bit part in the 1985 Oscar-winning film Out of Africa starring Robert Redford and Meryl Streep. She then portrayed Nina Beka in the 1987 thriller No Way Out with Kevin Costner, and Hedy in the Michael Caine comedy Surrender the same year.

During her first year in Hollywood, in 1991, she worked on several film productions. Among them were the Tim Hunter-directed Lies of the Twins and Star Trek VI: The Undiscovered Country, where she played a shapeshifting alien. In 1991, she appeared in The Linguini Incident opposite her then-fiancé David Bowie. She had a smaller part in the 1991 comedy House Party 2 and in the 1994 comedy/romance film Exit to Eden.

Video games
Iman made a cameo appearance alongside her husband David Bowie in the 1999 Windows 9x and Dreamcast 3D adventure game, Omikron: The Nomad Soul, developed by the video game company, Quantic Dream. In the game, she appears as one of the numerous Omikronian citizens the player can "reincarnate" into.

Philanthropy
In addition to running her global beauty company, Iman is also actively involved in a number of charitable endeavors. Since September 2019, Iman has held the role of CARE's first-ever Global Advocate, where she works alongside CARE to support its mission to create a world where poverty has been overcome and all people live with dignity and security. She is also currently a spokesperson for the Keep a Child Alive program, and works closely with the Children's Defense Fund. She also serves as an Ambassador for Save the Children, and has been active in raising awareness of their relief services in the greater East Africa region. Additionally, Iman works with the Enough Project to end the global trade in conflict minerals. She played a key part in the public campaign against blood diamonds through her termination of her contract with the diamonds conglomerate De Beers over a conflict of ethics.

Awards
Over the course of her long modeling and philanthropic career, Iman has received many awards. On 7 June 2010, she received a Fashion Icon lifetime achievement award from the Council of Fashion Designers of America (CFDA), a special prize reserved for "an individual whose signature style has had a profound influence on fashion". Iman selected her friend, actress and former model Isabella Rossellini, to present the award. Wearing a gown designed by Giambattista Valli with four giant diamond bracelets on each arm, Iman thanked her parents "for giving me a neck longer than any other girl on any go-see anywhere in the world".

Personal life

Iman is a Muslim. She has credited how her faith has helped her through the dark times. She is fluent in six languages: Somali, Arabic, Italian, French, Swahili and English. She also obtained American citizenship when she was in her twenties.

Iman was first married at age 18 to Hassan, a young Somali entrepreneur and Hilton hotel executive. The marriage ended a few years later when she moved to the United States to pursue a modeling career. In 1977, Iman dated the American actor Warren Beatty. Later that year, she became engaged to the American basketball player Spencer Haywood, and they married soon after. Their daughter, Zulekha Haywood, was born in 1978; in February 1987, the couple divorced.

In 1990, Iman met the English musician David Bowie on a surprise blind date set up by a friend in Los Angeles. The friend was hairdresser Teddy Antolin, who invited Iman to a party.  When she arrived at the restaurant, there were only four attendees: Antolin, Antolin's boyfriend, Iman, and Bowie. At the end of the evening, Bowie offered to drive her home, and she said: "No, I'm going to drive my car."  He invited her to tea the next day and Iman learned he did not drink tea. They went to a nearby coffee shop. Bowie named his 1991 instrumental piece "Abdulmajid" after her, which was later converted into a symphony by Philip Glass.

On 24 April 1992, Iman married Bowie in a private ceremony in Lausanne, Switzerland. The wedding was solemnized in Florence, Italy on 6 June. Their daughter, Alexandria Zahra Jones, was born 15 August 2000 at Mount Sinai Hospital in New York City. Iman is also stepmother to Bowie's son from a previous marriage, Duncan Jones. Both children bear Bowie's legal surname. Iman and her family resided primarily in Manhattan and London. When Bowie died on 10 January 2016, she wrote in tribute to him that "the struggle is real, but so is God".

Bibliography
 I Am Iman (2001)
 The Beauty of Color (2005)

Filmography

References

External links

  – official site
 
 
 
 
 
 Iman Cosmetics
 

1955 births
Living people
Ethnic Somali people
American cosmetics businesspeople
American fashion businesspeople
American film actresses
Participants in American reality television series
People from Mogadishu
Somalian actresses
Somalian emigrants to the United States
Somalian expatriates in the United Kingdom
Somalian fashion designers
Somalian female models
Somalian Muslims
Muslim models
Women fashion designers
21st-century American women